Juan Pérez Roldán (1604-1672) was a Spanish composer. He was maestro de capilla of la Encarnación from at least 1648 and of las Descalzas from 1655, then in his last years at El Pilar de Zaragoza, 1671-1672.

Works
  Tetis y Peleo - zarzuela (revived by Marta Almajano and others)

References

1604 births
1672 deaths
Spanish classical composers
17th-century classical composers